Choerolophodon is an extinct genus of proboscidean that lived during the Miocene of Eurasia and Africa. Fossils of Choerolophodon have been found in Africa, Southeast Europe, Turkey, Iraq, Iran, the Indian subcontinent, and China. Choerolophodon has a single pair of tusks growing from the upper jaw, which are long and strongly curved.

Taxonomy
 
Numerous species of Choerolophodon are known: C. pentelicus, C. anatolicus and C. chioticus from Southeast Europe (Turkey (Yamula Dam in Kayseri), Greece, Bulgaria) and the Middle East, C. palaeindicus and C. corrugatus from the Indian subcontinent, C. guangheensis from China, and C. ngorora and C. zaltaniensis from Africa. The name Choerolophodon was erected for "Mastodon" pentelicus from Greece by Schlesinger (1917) based on the discovery of new material from the pentelicus type locality. Choerolophodon is considered to be the most basal member of Elephantida.

Cultural significance

Possible influence on Greek myths 
Choerolophodon is among the fossil proboscideans represented in the Miocene-age deposits on the Greek island of Samos, alongside Konobelodon and Deinotherium. Adrienne Mayor and Nikos Solounias have speculated that these taxa may have influenced local legends of the island's deep history, serving as inspiration for gigantic mythical monsters called Neades, creatures whose voices were believed to cause earthquakes. Mayor and Solounias base their speculation on the fact that the fossils on Samos are found near a major fault zone, suggesting that ancient Greeks may have interpreted the presence of their skeletal remains as being associated with past seismic activity in the region. Ancient sources attest that the bones of these creatures were put on display and that their stories inspired local expressions such as "They shout louder than the Neades!"

Mayor and Solounias also suggest that these fossils may have inspired another story of the god Dionysus waging war with the Amazons on Samos, drawing similar comparisons between the island's geology and a description by Plutarch of this mythic fight. In this story, their skeletal remains are interpreted as belonging to the victims of this ancient war, who like the Neades were able to rend the earth when they cried out in death. They argue that ancient residents of Samos were aware of both the island's fossil record and its geology, and that these stories were early attempts to make sense of the two.

References

Choerolophodontidae
Miocene proboscideans
Prehistoric placental genera
Fossil taxa described in 1917
Prehistory of Southeastern Europe
Mammals of the Middle East
Mammals of South Asia